Pup is a name for a young animal, such as a puppy.

Pup or Pups may also refer to:

Places
 Pup Cove, South Orkney Islands, Antarctica
 Pup Creek, Kentucky
 Pup Rock, Graham Land, Antarctica

People
 Michael Clarke (cricketer), Australian cricketer nicknamed "Pup"
 Pup Phillips (1895-1953), American football player and coach

Aircraft
 Beagle Pup, a 1960s British light aircraft
 Dart Pup, a one-off British monoplane first flown in 1936
 Keystone NK or Pup, a US Navy two-seat biplane trainer introduced in 1930
 Preceptor N3 Pup, a family of ultralight homebuilt aircraft
 Pup, a variant of the Aviat Husky light utility aircraft
 Sopwith Pup, an aircraft used by the British in World War I

Art, entertainment, and media
 PUP (band), Canadian punk band based out of Toronto
 Pups (film), a 1999 film starring Burt Reynolds

Science
 Prokaryotic ubiquitin-like protein
 Puppis, abbreviated "Pup", a constellation
 Sirius B, a white dwarf star affectionately known as "the Pup"

Other uses
 pup, ISO 639-3 code for the Pulabu language of Papua New Guinea
 Crosley Pup, a low-cost AM radio introduced in 1925
 Pup tent, an older tent style

See also
 PUP (disambiguation)
 Puppy (disambiguation)